Malherbe Swart (born 27 March 1991) is a South African professional rugby union player currently playing with the. His regular position is scrum-half.

Rugby career

2008–2012 : Youth rugby

After high school, he continued to represent the Leopards at various youth levels.

He started ten of the s' twelve matches in the 2012 Under-21 Provincial Championship, playing off the bench in the other two. He scored three tries in the competition – he scored home and away against s, and also scored a try against  as the team finished in sixth place.

2013–present: Leopards and NWU Pukke

In 2013, Swart was included in the  squad that competed in the 2013 Vodacom Cup competition. He scored his first senior try in that match, getting the last of his side's 17 tries in a 113–3 victory. A third appearance against the  followed for his team that eventually missed out on a play-off spot on points difference.

He made four more starts in the season as the team again fell short, finishing in fifth place to miss out on the quarter finals. He was included in the  squad for the 2014 Currie Cup First Division, but failed to make any appearances.

Swart's 2015 season started by him playing for Potchefstroom-based university side  in the 2015 Varsity Cup. He scored his side's first try, but could not prevent the team from Bloemfontein winning 63–33 to condemn NWU Pukke to their second consecutive runners-up spot.

After the Varsity Cup, he rejoined the Leopards XV for his third successive Vodacom Cup campaign.

The Leopards missed out on a spot in the Currie Cup Premier Division by a single point, instead dropping into the First Division. Swart was the Leopards' first-choice scrum-half throughout that competition, starting all seven of their matches. He helped the Leopards beat the same opposition in the semi-finals a week later, and also started the final, where a 44–20 victory over the  secure the Leopards' first ever First Division title.

Swart started eight of the 's nine matches in the 2016 Varsity Cup, scoring tries against  and  en route to a third consecutive final. After losing three previous finals, the team finally won their first Varsity Cup trophy, beating Maties 7–6 in the final.

The team failed to qualify for the Currie Cup Premier Division after finishing in eighth place, which meant they could defend their First Division title. Swart played in all seven of their matches as the team once again made it all the way to the final with an unbeaten record, but this time fell short, with the  winning 44–25.

References

South African rugby union players
Living people
1991 births
People from Klerksdorp
Rugby union scrum-halves
Leopards (rugby union) players
Rugby union players from North West (South African province)